Hwangmok clan is one of the Korean clans. According to the census held by the statistics agency, five members are confirmed. Hwangmok clan’s word came from Araki (surname) in Japan.  was one of the main members.

See also 
 Korean clan names of foreign origin
 Urok Kim clan
 Hambak Kim clan
 Mangjeol
 Hwasun Song clan
 Songjin Jeup clan

References

External links 
 

Korean-language surnames
Korean clan names of Japanese origin